The 2008–09 Philadelphia 76ers season was the 70th season of the franchise, 60th in the National Basketball Association (NBA). The team finished with a .500 record. Following a 9-14 start, the team fired Maurice Cheeks and replaced him with Director of Player Personnel Tony Dileo on an interim basis. The team went 32-27 after the change and made the postseason.

Two things memorable about the season is that the team returned to the classic uniform style the team wore in the 1980s, and the Sixers defeated the Chicago Bulls in a game played at The Spectrum, the team's home from 1967–1996.

The team signed Elton Brand to a five-year $79 million dollar contract.

Key dates
 June 26: The 2008 NBA draft took place in New York City.
 July 1: The free agency period started.
 July 9: Signed 2-time All-Star PF Elton Brand.
 October 8: The Sixers' preseason started with a game against the Boston Celtics.
 October 29: The Sixers' regular season started with a game against the Toronto Raptors.
 December 13: The Sixers fired head coach Maurice Cheeks after a 9–14 start and appoint Assistant general manager Tony DiLeo as interim head coach.
 March 13: The Sixers played their last game at the Wachovia Spectrum against the Chicago Bulls.
 April 4: The Sixers clinched a playoff berth to the 2009 NBA Playoffs.
 April 30: The Sixers were eliminated from the 2009 NBA Playoffs with their game 6 loss to Orlando Magic finishing the series 4–2.

Summary

2008 NBA draft

On June 26, the Sixers selected power forward/center Marreese Speights from Florida with the 16th overall pick. Their second round pick was previously traded to the Utah Jazz on June 7, 2009 for a second round pick in the 2009 NBA draft.

Free Agency

The Sixers headed into the off-season with free agents Louis Amundson, Calvin Booth, Herbert Hill, Andre Iguodala, Kevin Ollie, Shavlik Randolph and Louis Williams.

On June 24, the Sixers extended qualifying offers to key restricted free agents Andre Iguodala and Louis Williams. The Sixers brought in Atlanta Hawks restricted free agent Josh Smith  on July 3 for a tour of Philadelphia but left the city without signing an offer sheet.

On July 9 after denouncing their rights to their unrestricted free agents, and trading Rodney Carney and Calvin Booth, the Sixers signed 2-time NBA All-Star Power Forward Elton Brand of the Los Angeles Clippers to a 5-year contract reportedly worth 78–82 Million dollars.

After the Brand signing, the first weeks of July were quiet in terms of free agency. Rumors spread that key restricted free agents Andre Iguodala and Louis Williams were being pursued by the Los Angeles Clippers and Golden State Warriors respectively.

On July 24 it was announced by Philly.com that the Sixers had come to terms with Point Guard Royal Ivey of the Milwaukee Bucks for a 2-year league minimum contract. The deal was finalized and signed on Monday July 28.

Also on July 28, Philly.com released that the Sixers had come to terms with Shooting Guard Kareem Rush of the Indiana Pacers. The deal was finalized and signed on Tuesday July 29.

After news reports stated that Louis Williams rejected a $3.9M deal from the Sixers and he was talking to the Cleveland Cavaliers, he signed a 5-year deal on July 31.

On August 12, ESPN announced that the 76ers had come to terms with restricted free agent Andre Iguodala on a reported 6-year 80 million dollar deal. After several days, it was officially announced on August 18 that Iguodala had signed the deal.

On August 19 Philly.com announced that veteran backup big man Theo Ratliff had agreed to terms on veterans league minimum 1 year 1.4 million dollar deal with the 76ers. Ratliff had previously played with Philadelphia from 1997–2001. Ratliff was named an All-Star in 2001, but was unable to play because of an injury.

On September 1, 2008 following his placement on waivers Donyell Marshall agreed to terms with the Philadelphia 76ers for a one-year contract for the league minimum $1,262,275 (for veterans with at least 10 years of experience).  The story was first reported by The Philadelphia Daily News

Draft picks

Roster

Regular season

Standings

Game log

|- bgcolor="#ffcccc"
| 1
| October 29
| Toronto
| 
| Louis Williams (16)
| Samuel Dalembert (17)
| Andre Iguodala (6)
| Wachovia Center15,750
| 0–1
|- bgcolor="#bbffbb"
| 2
| October 31
| New York
| 
| Elton Brand (24)
| Elton Brand (14)
| Andre Miller (8)
| Wachovia Center11,717
| 1–1

|- bgcolor="#ffcccc"
| 3
| November 1
| @ Atlanta
| 
| Thaddeus Young (22)
| Elton Brand (16)
| Andre Miller (8)
| Philips Arena19,651
| 1–2
|- bgcolor="#bbffbb"
| 4
| November 3
| Sacramento
| 
| Thaddeus Young (18)
| Samuel Dalembert (6)
| Andre Miller (5)
| Wachovia Center10,100
| 2–2
|- bgcolor="#ffcccc"
| 5
| November 5
| @ Miami
| 
| Thaddeus Young (19)
| Elton Brand (12)
| Andre Miller (6)
| American Airlines Arena15,103
| 2–3
|- bgcolor="#ffcccc"
| 6
| November 6
| @ Orlando
| 
| Thaddeus Young (19)
| Samuel Dalembert (14)
| Andre Iguodala (8)
| Amway Arena16,407
| 2–4
|- bgcolor="#ffcccc"
| 7
| November 11
| Utah
| 
| Andre Miller (25)
| Thaddeus Young, Samuel Dalembert (11)
| Andre Miller (6)
| Wachovia Center12,839
| 2–5
|- bgcolor="#bbffbb"
| 8
| November 12
| @ Toronto
| 
| Elton Brand (25)
| Andre Iguodala (9)
| Andre Iguodala (10)
| Air Canada Centre18,093
| 3–5
|- bgcolor="#bbffbb"
| 9
| November 14
| @ Indiana
| 
| Thaddeus Young (25)
| Elton Brand (15)
| Andre Miller, Elton Brand, Willie Green, Andre Iguodala (2)
| Conseco Fieldhouse12,742
| 4–5
|- bgcolor="#bbffbb"
| 10
| November 15
| Oklahoma City
| 
| Thaddeus Young (23)
| Samuel Dalembert (16)
| Andre Miller (9)
| Wachovia Center13,385
| 5–5
|- bgcolor="#ffcccc"
| 11
| November 19
| @ Minnesota
| 
| Andre Miller (20)
| Elton Brand (13)
| Andre Miller, Andre Iguodala (6)
| Target Center10,111
| 5–6
|- bgcolor="#bbffbb"
| 12
| November 21
| L.A. Clippers
| 
| Elton Brand, Thaddeus Young (17)
| Elton Brand, Samuel Dalembert (8)
| Andre Iguodala (12)
| Wachovia Center13,474
| 6–6
|- bgcolor="#bbffbb"
| 13
| November 23
| Golden State
| 
| Elton Brand (23)
| Samuel Dalembert (16)
| Andre Miller (8)
| Wachovia Center13,556
| 7–6
|- bgcolor="#ffcccc"
| 14
| November 24
| @ Charlotte
| 
| Elton Brand (18)
| Elton Brand (9)
| Andre Miller (6)
| Time Warner Cable Arena10,848
| 7–7
|- bgcolor="#ffcccc"
| 15
| November 26
| Orlando
| 
| Elton Brand (21)
| Samuel Dalembert (7)
| Andre Iguodala (7)
| Wachovia Center14,985
| 7–8
|- bgcolor="#ffcccc"
| 16
| November 28
| @ Boston
| 
| Elton Brand (18)
| Elton Brand (8)
| Louis Williams (6)
| TD Banknorth Garden18,624
| 7–9
|- bgcolor="#ffcccc"
| 17
| November 30
| Chicago
| 
| Elton Brand (21)
| Elton Brand (12)
| Andre Miller (10)
| Wachovia Center13,561
| 7–10

|- bgcolor="#bbffbb"
| 18
| December 2
| @ Chicago
| 
| Andre Miller (28)
| Elton Brand (14)
| Andre Iguodala (5)
| United Center20,485
| 8–10
|- bgcolor="#ffcccc"
| 19
| December 3
| L.A. Lakers
| 
| Andre Miller (26)
| Andre Miller, Thaddeus Young, Samuel Dalembert (8)
| Andre Miller, Andre Iguodala (5)
| Wachovia Center19,119
| 8–11
|- bgcolor="#bbffbb"
| 20
| December 5
| @ Detroit
| 
| Andre Miller (19)
| Andre Iguodala (8)
| Andre Iguodala (5)
| The Palace of Auburn Hills22,076
| 9–11
|- bgcolor="#ffcccc"
| 21
| December 6
| New Jersey
| 
| Andre Iguodala (20)
| Andre Iguodala (11)
| Andre Miller (5)
| Wachovia Center13,096
| 9–12
|- bgcolor="#ffcccc"
| 22
| December 10
| Cleveland
| 
| Andre Iguodala (27)
| Elton Brand (10)
| Andre Miller (8)
| Wachovia Center15,550
| 9–13
|- bgcolor="#ffcccc"
| 23
| December 12
| @ Cleveland
| 
| Willie Green (19)
| Elton Brand (11)
| Andre Miller (7)
| Quicken Loans Arena20,562
| 9–14
|- bgcolor="#bbffbb"
| 24
| December 13
| Washington
| 
| Elton Brand (27)
| Samuel Dalembert (17)
| Andre Miller (12)
| Wachovia Center15,865
| 10–14
|- bgcolor="#bbffbb"
| 25
| December 17
| Milwaukee
| 
| Louis Williams (25)
| Reggie Evans (9)
| Andre Iguodala (7)
| Wachovia Center11,538
| 11–14
|- bgcolor="#bbffbb"
| 26
| December 19
| @ Washington
| 
| Louis Williams (26)
| Andre Iguodala (9)
| Andre Miller (6)
| Verizon Center18,323
| 12–14
|- bgcolor="#ffcccc"
| 27
| December 20
| Indiana
| 
| Andre Iguodala (26)
| Samuel Dalembert (14)
| Andre Miller (12)
| Wachovia Center14,599
| 12–15
|- bgcolor="#ffcccc"
| 28
| December 23
| @ Boston
| 
| Louis Williams, Marreese Speights (16)
| Samuel Dalembert (13)
| Louis Williams, Andre Miller (8)
| TD Banknorth Garden18,624
| 12–16
|- bgcolor="#ffcccc"
| 29
| December 26
| @ Denver
| 
| Andre Iguodala (24)
| Samuel Dalembert (13)
| Andre Miller (8)
| Pepsi Center19,155
| 12–17
|- bgcolor="#ffcccc"
| 30
| December 29
| @ Utah
| 
| Andre Iguodala, Thaddeus Young (17)
| Reggie Evans (12)
| Andre Miller (8)
| EnergySolutions Arena19,911
| 12–18
|- bgcolor="#bbffbb"
| 31
| December 31
| @ L.A. Clippers
| 
| Andre Iguodala (28)
| Theo Ratliff (8)
| Andre Miller (9)
| Staples Center14,021
| 13–18

|- bgcolor="#ffcccc"
| 32
| January 2
| @ Dallas
| 
| Andre Iguodala (22)
| Andre Miller (11)
| Andre Iguodala (5)
| American Airlines Center20,327
| 13–19
|- bgcolor="#ffcccc"
| 33
| January 3
| @ San Antonio
| 
| Andre Miller (28)
| Andre Iguodala (8)
| Andre Iguodala (8)
| AT&T Center18,797
| 13–20
|- bgcolor="#bbffbb"
| 34
| January 6
| Houston
| 
| Andre Iguodala (28)
| Marreese Speights (8)
| Andre Miller, Louis Williams (8)
| Wachovia Center14,858
| 14–20
|- bgcolor="#bbffbb"
| 35
| January 7
| @ Milwaukee
| 
| Andre Miller (28)
| Andre Miller (9)
| Andre Iguodala (7)
| Bradley Center13,381
| 15–20
|- bgcolor="#bbffbb"
| 36
| January 9
| Charlotte
| 
| Andre Miller (22)
| Samuel Dalembert (9)
| Andre Iguodala (7)
| Wachovia Center14,235
| 16–20
|- bgcolor="#bbffbb"
| 37
| January 11
| @ Atlanta
| 
| Andre Iguodala (27)
| Thaddeus Young (9)
| Andre Iguodala (9)
| Philips Arena15,079
| 17–20
|- bgcolor="#bbffbb"
| 38
| January 14
| Portland
| 
| Andre Iguodala (29)
| Samuel Dalembert (9)
| Louis Williams, Andre Iguodala, Andre Miller (6)
| Wachovia Center14,561
| 18–20
|- bgcolor="#bbffbb"
| 39
| January 16
| San Antonio
| 
| Thaddeus Young (27)
| Samuel Dalembert (12)
| Andre Iguodala (8)
| Wachovia Center18,739
| 19–20
|- bgcolor="#bbffbb"
| 40
| January 17
| @ New York
| 
| Andre Iguodala (28)
| Andre Iguodala, Thaddeus Young (10)
| Andre Miller (8)
| Madison Square Garden19,408
| 20–20
|- bgcolor="#ffcccc"
| 41
| January 19
| Dallas
| 
| Louis Williams (25)
| Andre Iguodala (12)
| Andre Miller (7)
| Wachovia Center14,503
| 20–21
|- bgcolor="#bbffbb"
| 42
| January 24
| New York
| 
| Andre Iguodala (24)
| Samuel Dalembert (17)
| Andre Iguodala (6)
| Wachovia Center19,239
| 21–21
|- bgcolor="#ffcccc"
| 43
| January 26
| @ New Orleans
| 
| Thaddeus Young (22)
| Samuel Dalembert (12)
| Andre Iguodala (7)
| New Orleans Arena16,131
| 21–22
|- bgcolor="#bbffbb"
| 44
| January 28
| @ Houston
| 
| Andre Iguodala (20)
| Samuel Dalembert (13)
| Andre Miller (7)
| Toyota Center15,544
| 22–22
|- bgcolor="#bbffbb"
| 45
| January 30
| Washington
| 
| Andre Iguodala, Willie Green (20)
| Thaddeus Young (9)
| Andre Miller (9)
| Wachovia Center15,528
| 23–22
|- bgcolor="#ffcccc"
| 46
| January 31
| New Jersey
| 
| Andre Miller (19)
| Elton Brand (9)
| Andre Miller (7)
| Wachovia Center17,783
| 23–23

|- bgcolor="#ffcccc"
| 47
| February 3
| Boston
| 
| Andre Iguodala (22)
| Reggie Evans (10)
| Andre Miller (7)
| Wachovia Center16,831
| 23–24
|- bgcolor="#bbffbb"
| 48
| February 5
| Indiana
| 
| Willie Green (23)
| Samuel Dalembert (20)
| Andre Miller (12)
| Wachovia Center10,699
| 24–24
|- bgcolor="#bbffbb"
| 49
| February 7
| Miami
| 
| Andre Miller, Marreese Speights (15)
| Samuel Dalembert (10)
| Andre Miller, Andre Iguodala (5)
| Wachovia Center17,216
| 25–24
|- bgcolor="#bbffbb"
| 50
| February 9
| Phoenix
| 
| Thaddeus Young (25)
| Samuel Dalembert (11)
| Andre Iguodala (7)
| Wachovia Center16,797
| 26–24
|- bgcolor="#bbffbb"
| 51
| February 11
| Memphis
| 
| Andre Miller (24)
| Samuel Dalembert (7)
| Andre Miller (9)
| Wachovia Center12,812
| 27–24
|- bgcolor="#ffcccc"
| 52
| February 17
| @ Indiana
| 
| Andre Iguodala (20)
| Reggie Evans (11)
| Andre Iguodala (9)
| Conseco Fieldhouse13,259
| 27–25
|- bgcolor="#ffcccc"
| 53
| February 18
| Denver
| 
| Andre Miller (17)
| Samuel Dalembert, Marreese Speights (10)
| Andre Iguodala (4)
| Wachovia Center15,979
| 27–26
|- bgcolor="#ffcccc"
| 54
| February 21
| @ Miami
| 
| Andre Miller (30)
| Andre Miller (9)
| Andre Iguodala (8)
| American Airlines Arena19,600
| 27–27
|- bgcolor="#ffcccc"
| 55
| February 23
| @ New Jersey
| 
| Andre Iguodala (21)
| Samuel Dalembert (10)
| Andre Miller (10)
| Izod Center13,236
| 27–28
|- bgcolor="#bbffbb"
| 56
| February 25
| @ Washington
| 
| Andre Iguodala (22)
| Samuel Dalembert (13)
| Andre Iguodala (11)
| Verizon Center16,505
| 28–28
|- bgcolor="#bbffbb"
| 57
| February 27
| @ New York
| 
| Andre Miller (25)
| Samuel Dalembert (14)
| Andre Miller (6)
| Madison Square Garden19,763
| 29–28
|- bgcolor="#ffcccc"
| 58
| February 28
| Orlando
| 
| Andre Miller (23)
| Andre Miller (8)
| Andre Miller (7)
| Wachovia Center19,703
| 29–29

|- bgcolor="#ffcccc"
| 59
| March 2
| New Orleans
| 
| Andre Iguodala (30)
| Reggie Evans (8)
| Andre Miller (7)
| Wachovia Center14,299
| 29–30
|- bgcolor="#bbffbb"
| 60
| March 7
| @ Memphis
| 
| Andre Iguodala (24)
| Andre Miller (10)
| Andre Miller (8)
| FedExForum14,458
| 30–30
|- bgcolor="#ffcccc"
| 61
| March 8
| @ Oklahoma City
| 
| Thaddeus Young, Andre Miller (20)
| Andre Iguodala (8)
| Andre Iguodala, Andre Miller (3)
| Ford Center18,738
| 30–31
|- bgcolor="#bbffbb"
| 62
| March 11
| Toronto
| 
| Thaddeus Young (29)
| Samuel Dalembert (13)
| Andre Iguodala, Andre Miller (7)
| Wachovia Center17,292
| 31–31
|- bgcolor="#bbffbb"
| 63
| March 13
| Chicago
| 
| Thaddeus Young (31)
| Samuel Dalembert (19)
| Andre Miller (13)
| Wachovia Spectrum17,563
| 32–31
|- bgcolor="#bbffbb"
| 64
| March 15
| Miami
| 
| Andre Iguodala (21)
| Samuel Dalembert (12)
| Andre Miller (11)
| Wachovia Center20,100
| 33–31
|- bgcolor="#bbffbb"
| 65
| March 17
| @ L.A. Lakers
| 
| Andre Iguodala (25)
| Samuel Dalembert (14)
| Louis Williams, Andre Miller (6)
| Staples Center18,997
| 34–31
|- bgcolor="#ffcccc"
| 66
| March 18
| @ Phoenix
| 
| Andre Miller, Thaddeus Young (23)
| Samuel Dalembert (6)
| Andre Miller (8)
| US Airways Center18,422
| 34–32
|- bgcolor="#ffcccc"
| 67
| March 20
| @ Golden State
| 
| Thaddeus Young (23)
| Samuel Dalembert (23)
| Andre Iguodala (7)
| Oracle Arena19,596
| 34–33
|- bgcolor="#bbffbb"
| 68
| March 22
| @ Sacramento
| 
| Andre Iguodala (27)
| Andre Iguodala (7)
| Andre Miller (8)
| ARCO Arena12,943
| 35–33
|- bgcolor="#bbffbb"
| 69
| March 23
| @ Portland
| 
| Andre Miller (27)
| Andre Miller (10)
| Andre Iguodala (5)
| Rose Garden20,620
| 36–33
|- bgcolor="#bbffbb"
| 70
| March 25
| Minnesota
| 
| Thaddeus Young (29)
| Andre Iguodala, Andre Miller, Samuel Dalembert (7)
| Andre Iguodala (6)
| Wachovia Center16,965
| 37–33
|- bgcolor="#ffcccc"
| 71
| March 27
| Charlotte
| 
| Andre Iguodala (25)
| Thaddeus Young (7)
| Thaddeus Young (4)
| Wachovia Center19,098
| 37–34
|- bgcolor="#ffcccc"
| 72
| March 29
| @ Detroit
| 
| Andre Iguodala (27)
| Thaddeus Young (8)
| Andre Miller (6)
| The Palace of Auburn Hills22,076
| 37–35
|- bgcolor="#bbffbb"
| 73
| March 31
| Atlanta
| 
| Andre Iguodala (19)
| Samuel Dalembert (7)
| Andre Miller (10)
| Wachovia Center18,256
| 38–35

|- bgcolor="#bbffbb"
| 74
| April 2
| Milwaukee
| 
| Louis Williams (21)
| Samuel Dalembert (10)
| Andre Miller (11)
| Wachovia Center17,640
| 39–35
|- bgcolor="#bbffbb"
| 75
| April 4
| Detroit
| 
| Andre Iguodala (31)
| Andre Miller (10)
| Andre Miller (12)
| Wachovia Center19,832
| 40–35
|- bgcolor="#ffcccc"
| 76
| April 5
| @ New Jersey
| 
| Louis Williams (14)
| Reggie Evans, Samuel Dalembert (11)
| Andre Iguodala (5)
| Izod Center13,345
| 40–36
|- bgcolor="#ffcccc"
| 77
| April 7
| @ Charlotte
| 
| Andre Miller (23)
| Theo Ratliff (5)
| Andre Miller (7)
| Time Warner Cable Arena16,499
| 40–37
|- bgcolor="#ffcccc"
| 78
| April 9
| @ Chicago
| 
| Andre Miller (20)
| Andre Iguodala (7)
| Andre Iguodala (10)
| United Center20,791
| 40–38
|- bgcolor="#ffcccc"
| 79
| April 10
| Cleveland
| 
| Andre Iguodala (26)
| Samuel Dalembert (7)
| Willie Green (4)
| Wachovia Center20,484
| 40–39
|- bgcolor="#ffcccc"
| 80
| April 12
| @ Toronto
| 
| Louis Williams (23)
| Samuel Dalembert (12)
| Andre Iguodala (8)
| Air Canada Centre18,018
| 40–40
|- bgcolor="#ffcccc"
| 81
| April 14
| Boston
| 
| Andre Iguodala (25)
| Samuel Dalembert (9)
| Andre Miller (9)
| Wachovia Center17,752
| 40–41
|- bgcolor="#bbffbb"
| 82
| April 15
| @ Cleveland
| 
| Andre Miller (28)
| Thaddeus Young (9)
| Andre Miller (8)
| Quicken Loans Arena20,562
| 41–41

Playoffs

First round
In the first round of the 2009 NBA Playoffs, the sixth seeded Philadelphia 76ers were paired with the third seed Southeast Division champions and eventual Eastern Conference champion Orlando Magic in a best-of-seven series. The Sixers managed to split the series with the Magic at two games a piece after four games, but the Magic went on to win what would be the final two games of the series to eliminate the Sixers.

Game log

|- bgcolor="#bbffbb"
| 1
| April 19
| @ Orlando
| 
| Andre Iguodala (20)
| Andre Iguodala (8)
| Andre Iguodala (8)
| Amway Arena17,461
| 1–0
|- bgcolor="#ffcccc"
| 2
| April 22
| @ Orlando
| 
| Andre Miller (30)
| Andre Iguodala, Theo Ratliff (8)
| Andre Iguodala (7)
| Amway Arena17,461
| 1–1
|- bgcolor="#bbffbb"
| 3
| April 24
| Orlando
| 
| Andre Iguodala (29)
| Andre Miller, Samuel Dalembert (9)
| Andre Miller (7)
| Wachovia Center16,492
| 2–1
|- bgcolor="#ffcccc"
| 4
| April 26
| Orlando
| 
| Andre Miller (17)
| Samuel Dalembert (9)
| Andre Iguodala (11)
| Wachovia Center16,464
| 2–2
|- bgcolor="#ffcccc"
| 5
| April 28
| @ Orlando
| 
| Andre Iguodala (26)
| Andre Miller (6)
| Samuel Dalembert (9)
| Amway Arena17,461
| 2–3
|- bgcolor="#ffcccc"
| 6
| April 30
| Orlando
| 
| Andre Miller (24)
| Andre Iguodala (6)
| Samuel Dalembert (13)
| Wachovia Center16,691
| 2–4

Player statistics

Season

Playoffs

Awards and records

Awards
 Thaddeus Young was selected as a member of the sophomore team in the T-Mobile Rookie Challenge on All-Star Weekend.

Records

Injuries and surgeries
 August 7: Jason Smith tore his ACL at an offseason Las Vegas NBA Camp.
 February 5: Elton Brand tore the labrum of his right shoulder and it was announced that he would undergo season ending surgery on February 9.

Transactions

Trades

Free agents

Additions

Subtractions

References

Philadelphia 76ers seasons
Philadelphia
2008 in sports in Pennsylvania
2009 in sports in Pennsylvania